Linabelle Ruth Ramos Villarica (born July 25, 1949) is a Filipino politician who currently serves as the member of the House of Representatives from the 4th District of Bulacan since 2022 and previously from 2010 to 2019. She previously served as mayor of Meycauayan from 2019 to 2022.

Early life and education
Linabelle Villarica was born on July 25, 1949 in Espiritu (now Banna), Ilocos Norte. She graduated at the University of the Philippines Diliman with a course of Bachelor of Arts in speech and drama.

Political career

Congresswoman for the 4th District (2010–2019)
Villarica served as the member of the House of Representatives from the 4th District for nine years. She filed many house bills, including House Bill 4113 (100-Day Maternity Leave Bill). She served three terms in the House and also formerly served as Deputy Speaker.

Mayor of Meycauayan (2019–2022)
Villarica ran for mayor of Meycauayan in 2019 and won. She switched places with her husband Henry Villarica, who ran for congressman. She was sworn in on June 30, 2019.

Congresswoman for the 4th District (2022–present)
Villarica ran for a return to Congress, switching places once again with her husband Henry Villarica. They eventually won the elections.

Personal life
Villarica is married to Henry Villarica, a former mayor of Meycauayan and now congressman from Bulacan's 4th district. Their family runs the Villarica Pawnshop. They have four children together.

On March 26, 2020, after her husband tested positive for COVID-19, she was placed under home quarantine.

References

1949 births
Living people
Mayors of places in Bulacan
Members of the House of Representatives of the Philippines from Bulacan
PDP–Laban politicians
Liberal Party (Philippines) politicians
University of the Philippines Diliman alumni